Michael W. Frerichs (born July 28, 1973) is an American politician serving his third term as the State Treasurer of Illinois, after first taking office on January 12, 2015. Before being elected treasurer, he was a Democratic member of the Illinois Senate, representing the 52nd District from 2007 until 2015. The district, located in Champaign and Vermilion counties, includes all or parts of Champaign, Danville, Georgetown, Gifford, Rantoul, Thomasboro, and Urbana.

Early life and career
Frerichs was born and raised in Gifford. Upon graduating from Rantoul Township High School, Frerichs attended Yale University and received his BA in 1995. He then attended National Cheng Kung University in Taiwan where he studied Mandarin Chinese while teaching English courses. He returned to Champaign County and launched his own technology business and served on his local volunteer fire department.

Champaign County official
In 1998, Frerichs ran against then-State Representative Tim Johnson but lost. In 2000, Frerichs was elected to the Champaign County Board and reelected in 2002.

Later that year, Frerichs was appointed to succeed Gerrie Parr as the Champaign County Auditor by his fellow board members. As Auditor, he was responsible for preparing budget reports, maintaining financial records, ensuring the county met state and federal financial reporting requirements, preventing fraud, and improving the financial health of the county. At the time, he was the only County Auditor in the state to become a Certified Public Finance Officer. Two years later, he was elected to the position.

Illinois State Senator
In 2005, Frerichs announced he would run for the 52nd Senate District seat – which includes most of Champaign County and Vermilion County – to fill the vacancy caused by Rick Winkel's retirement. In what became the most expensive State Senate race of 2006, Frerichs was elected over former Senator Judith Myers by a margin of approximately 500 votes. He was the first Democratic State Senator to represent East Central Illinois since 1936.

Frerichs served as Chairman of the Illinois Senate's Committee on Higher Education, where he championed efforts to make college more affordable, and the Agriculture & Conservation and Enterprise Zone Extensions Committees. He also served on the Financial Institutions, Licensed Activities and Pensions, Public Pensions & State Investments, and the Agriculture & Conservation committees.

During his time in the Senate, Frerichs led efforts to eliminate the legislative scholarship program and advocated for the disclosure of chemicals used in fracking. After Governor Rod Blagojevich was removed from office for corruption, Frerichs moved to have the former governor barred from ever holding office again in Illinois. This motion was carried unanimously.

Treasurer of Illinois

2014 election

Frerichs announced his intention to run for the vacated office of Illinois Treasurer in early January 2014, after incumbent Republican Treasurer Dan Rutherford had announced his intention to run for Governor of Illinois. Frerichs ran uncontested in the Democratic Party primary and faced Republican Illinois State Representative and former Illinois State House Minority Leader Tom Cross in the General Election on November 4.

For more than two weeks after election day, the election was too close to call. Frerichs was declared the winner, defeating Cross 48.1% to 47.8%. The election was one of the closest in Illinois state history, being decided by only 9,225 votes out of more than 3.5 million ballots cast.

2018 election 

Frerichs sought reelection as State Treasurer in the 2018 election. He ran unopposed in the Democratic Party primary and faced Orland Park Village Trustee Jim Dodge, the Republican candidate, and financial analyst Mike Leheney, the Libertarian candidate, in the November 6, 2018, general election. Frerichs won with over 57.6% of the vote.

2022 election 

Frerichs was unopposed for State Treasurer in the 2022 primary election. In the November 8, 2022 general election, he faced Republican State Rep. Tom Demmer and Libertarian candidate Preston Nelson. Frerichs won with 54.3% of the vote.

Tenure
Frerichs was first inaugurated on January 12, 2015. He was inaugurated for his second term on January 14, 2019. He was inaugurated for his third term on January 9, 2023. He is currently serving as the 74th Treasurer of Illinois. He also serves as a Trustee and vice-chair of the Illinois State Board of Investment (ISBI).  Frerichs was unanimously elected president of the bipartisan National Association of State Auditors, Comptrollers, and Treasurers in 2022. He was elected by his bipartisan peers to serve as senior vice-president of the National Association of State Treasurers (NAST) in 2022. Frerichs was elected Secretary-Treasurer of the National Association of State Treasurers (NAST) for 2022, and was also elected by his peers across the country to serve on the National Association of State Auditors, Comptrollers and Treasurers' (NASACT) Executive Committee. The College Savings Plans Network honored Frerichs with its Distinguished Service Award in 2022.

As treasurer, Frerichs has focused on the unclaimed property program. He modernized the program and since took over, the office has returned a record-breaking $1.6 billion in forgotten cash and stock has been returned to individuals, employers, and non-profits.

Frerichs also has worked to make college more affordable for families saving for their children’s future. He made changes to the Bright Start college savings program, taking it from worst to among the nation’s best. Independent analyst Morningstar awarded Bright Start the Gold rating five years in a row. The treasurer lowered fees and provided more investment options for families. 

Illinois now leads a multi-state alliance that allows parents of children with blindness or a disability to save for their child without jeopardizing their federal disability benefits. Achieving a Better Life Experience Program (ABLE) is the national standard, offering high-quality and low-cost investment options. His office also led negotiations that resulted in lower fees for participants.

In November 2018, Treasurer Frerichs launched Secure Choice, a retirement savings program that will benefit an estimated 1.2 million private-sector workers in Illinois who do not have access to an employer-sponsored retirement plan. So far, 114,000 Illinois workers have saved more than $100 million that will help them retire with dignity.

Personal life 

Frerichs married Laura Appenzeller in 2003. They had one daughter in 2008 and divorced in 2013. Frerichs married marketing executive Erica Baker in 2022. Frerichs is a member of Good Shepherd Lutheran Church (ELCA) in Champaign, Illinois.

Electoral history

References

External links

Illinois State Treasurer's Office
Mike Frerichs for Illinois Treasurer
Senator Michael W. Frerichs (D) 52nd District at the Illinois General Assembly
By session: 98th, 97th, 96th, 95th

|-

1973 births
21st-century American politicians
American accountants
County board members in Illinois
Democratic Party Illinois state senators
State treasurers of Illinois
Living people
National Cheng Kung University alumni
Academic staff of the National Cheng Kung University
People from Champaign County, Illinois
Yale University alumni